The Battle of Napue was fought on 19 February 1714 (O.S.) / 2 March 1714 (N.S.) at the villages of Napue and Laurola in the Isokyrö parish of the Swedish Empire (modern Finland) between the Swedish Empire and the Tsardom of Russia. It was the final land battle of the Finnish campaign in the Great Northern War. The Swedish detachment, consisting almost entirely of Finnish troops, were defeated by the numerically superior Russian force. As a result, all of Finland fell under Russian military occupation for the rest of the War; a seven-year period of hardship known in Finland as the Great Wrath. The Kyrö Distillery Company named its Napue rye gin after the battle in 2014.

Prelude
By 1703 Russian forces had reached the inner parts of the Gulf of Finland, and founded the city of Saint Petersburg. Since the Swedish main army was engaged in Poland and later in Russia, Sweden was hard pressed to defend its Baltic territories. After the battle of Poltava, Russia took all of Livonia, Estonia and Ingria, as well as the counties of Viborg, Savonlinna and Kexholm.

When Charles XII of Sweden refused to enter peace negotiations, Denmark and Russia drew up plans with the purpose to threaten Stockholm. Two attack routes were considered: one through southern Sweden and the other through Finland and the Åland islands. The southern attack was deemed more important, but the attack on Finland was to be carried out in order to tie down as much of the remaining Swedish army as possible there. However, the attack from the south was successfully fended off by Magnus Stenbock's victory at Helsingborg in 1710.

The Russian attack on Finland never developed as planned. Since Peter the Great was engaged in a war against Turkey, the resulting lack of soldiers forced him to postpone the conquest of Åbo. Initial Russian actions in Finland consisted of raids and reconnaissance operations, with the purpose of occupying southeastern Finland and devastating it in order to deny Swedish forces a base of operations against the Russian-controlled areas around Saint Petersburg.

Significant Russian military action in Finland began in 1713, after logistical problems caused the failure of an initial foray the previous year. Already in May, Peter and his galley fleet were seen off Helsingfors, and during the summer all of southern Finland was occupied by Russian troops. The Swedish forces under general Georg Henrik Lybecker retreated inland. Before returning to Russia, Peter commanded Fyodor Apraksin, the commander of the Imperial Navy to attack the Swedish army during the winter.

General Carl Gustaf Armfeldt was given command over the troops in Finland in August 1713. He faced a hopeless task; Lybecker had left him with a neglected, starving, destitute army. Reconnaissance wasn't possible because the cavalry was too worn out to carry out its duties.

The Russian army arrives at Ostrobothnia

Golitzin's army, consisting of 11 000 men, arrived at Ilmajoki in the middle of February. Armfelt decided to locate the battle to Isokyrö, for some pressure was applied by the Swedish regime, aided by the honour of a military officer. 
Most of his officers were against this decision, but Armfelt remained assured by local reserves that did not want to hand their homes and families over to Russian terror.
Only six of the nearest communes or villages had time enough to send reinforcements.
Armfelt had altogether 5 500 men which he at first located on both sides across from the river, in three brigades each consisting of four lines.

The Battle is at sight

After gaining the knowledge that Golitzin's main troops had a few kilometers earlier departed to the right and were coming from the north, Armfelt relocated his troops so that the brigades of Von Freidenfelt, Von Essen, Maidell and Yxkull were on the northern side of the river. 
A small group with two guns occupied the hill of Napue. De La Barre's cavalry of 1 000 men, plus a group of 300 men under Ziesing, were ordered southwest from Napue to prevent Chekin's free drive along the river.
Golitzin's main forces consisted of 6 500, Chekin's regiments of about 1 800 men.
Before the battle Golitzin ordered three regiments of his northern troops with cossacks to veer west, aiming to amass behind the Finnish mainforces. Chekin as well separated one regiment to veer Finnish troops from the south.

The battle

The Beginning of the battle

The Finnish troops took the first step and started the fight with two guns on their left wing, getting an answer from the Russian artillery on their right. The Russians burnt the nearest house of Turppala, and the Finnish artillery used all the 64 shells that they had left and after firing just one volley, the infantry rushed fiercely against the Russians.
The battle at close quarters was carried out with swords, bayonets and spears, and soon there were so many killed and wounded men that it was difficult to get over them and carry on the attack. 
The Finnish troops, especially the brigades of Maidell and Yxkull near the house of Turppala were very lucky and pushed the Russians backwards so that Armfelt thought that the battle could end up in victory.

A Change of luck

But at this stage the over 2,000 Russians that were sent to veer the Finns from the west appeared at the back of the Finns, who had no reserves to call for help.
It was three o’clock in the afternoon. Only a half of Freidenfelt's and Essen's men were left, 1,300 Finns were fighting for their lives against 3,000 Russians.
Ziesing's small group in the south was beaten as well as Taube's group at Napue.
It is more than likely that General De La Barre's 1,000 men fled without taking real part in the battle. That is also the opinion of the local vicar Nils Aejmelaeus who was viewing the battle at a close distance - maybe on the so-called Rock of Kaam near the monument, on the other side of the road. As Aejmelaeus himself arrived to Vörå, De La Barre's cavalry was already there.
Now there was a clear way for Tsekin's troops to attack at the rear of the rest of Finns. Soon almost all the Finns were surrounded, and Armfelt commanded Maidell and Yxkull to withdraw, which in that state was more easily said than done.
Almost all the commanders were killed. Von Essen fought with his sword up to his end having 32 wounds in his body. 82 per cent of his regiment was lost.
The battle field was filled with dead and wounded men. The rest were trying to flee to the rocky hill behind the present monument, and from there towards Laihia.
Very few of the local reserves were lucky enough to survive. Armfelt himself had to fight his way towards Laihia.

Aftermath

The Sad end of the battle

This bloody battle had lasted a little over two hours. Concrete signs of it were seen on the field for over two hundred years. At Napue, on an area of about four hectares there were 17 graves in the middle of the 18th century. And in the beginning of the 20th century there were still open piles of human bones.
The Finnish army lost over 3,000 men, 2,645 of whom were killed. Only 512 were taken prisoner, but most of them were killed on the way to the Russian ships or died in the terrible conditions of Saint Petersburg.
The Russians lost, according to their own announcement, about 1,478 men.  According to a Russian scholar, Aradir, the figure was over 2,000.
Isokyrö lost 45 percent, Laihia 60 percent, and Vähäkyrö 70 percent of their male population. The figures from Ylistaro are not known exactly, but they must have been about 50 percent.

The Genocide

In the "mental atmosphere" after the Second World War, the traditional narratives were often considered exaggerated. According to latest researches the situation seems to have been even worse. Many scholars (Vilkuna, Keski-Sarja, Ylikangas) are talking about genocide or holocaust.

The human losses did not end at this, for after the battle the situation turned to hell for the civil population. The Russian soldiers were allowed to "do whatever they wanted to". Almost all the women were raped, people were killed and tortured for no reason, houses were burnt, and robbing of possessions and cattle was widespread.
The command on Peter the Great was not to occupy but to make the region impossible for living. In that sense, a huge number of young children were captured and taken as slaves to Russia. Just a few percent of them managed to come back home.
People fled to distant cottages or saunas that were earlier built for tar burner workers. Remains of at least fifteen stone foundations of such hideouts can still be found in the forests of Isokyrö. 
So it is no wonder that people in this area have for a long time had some doubts and mistrust concerning Russians. The saying: "A Russian is a Russian even if fried in butter", was based on these terrible collective memories.

A contemporary Swedish historian, Jonas Nordin from the University of Stockholm stated in 2000, the Finnish part of the kingdom was not properly defended. Many of the Swedish authorities considered, as crown prince Adolf Fredrik in 1746, Finland as their storeroom and wall against Russia.

This review of the battle is revised to respond the knowledge of today as found for example in the book "The Folk of Hard Tribulations", "Kovien kokemusten kansaa"  by Kalervo Mielty in 2013, which is based on thorough investigation of all the available studies and local tradition of today.

Similar views as presented above were also represented by professors Heikki Yli-Kangas, Kustaa H. J. Vilkuna and Ville Sarkamo in Napue-seminar, spring 2014. These views will come up in a film document (containing reviews of Yli-Kangas, Vilkuna, Knaapi, Mielty, Loukola), 23 November 2014.

References

Napue
1714 in Europe
Napue
Napue
Napue
History of Ostrobothnia (region)